Heptene is a higher olefin, or alkene with the formula C7H14.
The commercial product is a liquid that is a mixture of isomers. It is used as an additive in lubricants, as a catalyst, and as a surfactant. This chemical is also known as heptylene.

References
2. Carl Schaschke, 2014, A Dictionary of Chemical Engineering, Oxford University Press.

3. G. I. Nikishin, Yu. N. Ogibin & L. Kh. Rakhmatullina, 1975, ‘Peroxydisulfate-initiated reactions of 1-heptene with acetic and propionic acids’, Bulletin of the Academy of Sciences of the USSR, Division of chemical science, volume 23, pages1479–1483 

4. Yu. D. Shenin, T. V. Kotenko & A. N. Egorenkova, Nystatin. IV. 1969, The heptaene component of samples of nystatin-nursimicin, Pharmaceutical Chemistry Journal volume 3, pages 631–634 

5. Nicholas E. Leadbeater, Cynthia B. McGowan, 2013, Experiment 2: Second-Order Elimination Reaction Preparation of Heptene from 2-Bromoheptane, Laboratory Experiments Using Microwave Heating, chapter 3 

6.  E. S. Mortikov, M. I. Rozengart & B. A. Kazanskii, 1968, Dehydrocyclization of n-heptenes under conditions of a pulsed system and in the usual flow-type setup, Bulletin of the Academy of Sciences of the USSR, Division of chemical science volume 17, pages95–98(1968)

Alkenes